Bailey Taylor Sloane is an English professional footballer who plays as a defender for Radcliffe on loan from Accrington Stanley.

Career
Sloane started his career playing youth football with Bury, whilst also representing the Greater Manchester County Schools side. After Bury's youth team was disbanded following administration, he signed for AFC Fylde as a youth scholar in 2019.

On 24 August 2020, he began his senior career in non-league when he signed for North West Counties Football League Division One North side Bury AFC. He only made two appearances for the club before he went on to sign for Chester on a two-year youth scholarship. In August 2021 he transferred to North West Counties Premier Division side Avro on dual-registration. He made 21 appearances for the club in all competitions, scoring twice, including once in has last game against Vauxhall Motors. On 18 November 2021, he was on the move again when he stepped up a division to sign for Northern Premier League Division One West side Clitheroe.

On 1 September 2022, he turned professional when he signed for EFL League One side Accrington Stanley for an undisclosed fee, putting pen to paper on a two-year deal. He had played for Clitheroe in a pre-season friendly against Accrington's under-21 side managed by Ged Brannan in July 2022 and then impressed when invited on trial. Upon signing, manager, John Coleman, stated "I like Bailey's attitude; I like his hunger and he's a good footballer". He made his professional debut three days later in the 2–0 League One defeat to Ipswich Town at the Crown Ground, replacing Ethan Hamilton as a late substitute.

On 11 November 2022, he joined National League North strugglers AFC Telford United on a one-month long loan deal.

On 23 February 2024, he joined Radcliffe on a one-month long loan deal.

Career statistics

References

2000s births
Living people
English footballers
Association football defenders
English Football League players
National League (English football) players
Northern Premier League players
North West Counties Football League players
Bury F.C. players
AFC Fylde players
Bury A.F.C. players
Clitheroe F.C. players
Accrington Stanley F.C. players
AFC Telford United players
Radcliffe F.C. players